Acharya Bhutabali (7th century CE) was a Digambara monk. He along with Acharya Pushpadanta composed the most sacred Jain text, Satkhandagama..

Legacy
Shrut Panchami (scripture fifth) is celebrated by Jains in may every year commemorating Pushpadanta and Bhutabali.

Notes

References
 

Indian Jain monks
1st-century Indian Jains
1st-century Jain monks
1st-century Indian monks